Jade Q. Wang (born 1983) is an American computer programmer and neuroscientist. She is a co-founder of the open source project Sandstorm, and founder of the hacker-focused hostel chain Chez JJ.

Education
Wang graduated from Stanford University in 2005 with a bachelor's degree in biology, where she co-authored the paper "Akt Contributes to Neuroprotection by Hypothermia against Cerebral Ischemia in Rats" in The Journal of Neuroscience. She has also been published in the Journal of Neurosurgery. She completed her Ph.D in neuroscience in 2010 at Northwestern University, where she worked in the auditory neuroscience lab of Nina Kraus.

Career
From 2010 to 2012, Wang worked as a research scientist at the NASA Ames Research Center, where she did human-computer interaction research.

Wang is the co-founder of Chez JJ with Jocelyn Berl. Chez JJ is a "chain of three hacker homes", two in San Francisco and one in Mountain View in Silicon Valley. Chez JJ has been investigated for not complying with zoning codes, and was fined by the city of San Francisco after complaints from neighbors, whose disputes with Chez JJ were widely reported in the press. Partly as a result, it shut down in 2015, after providing housing for over 400 residents.

Wang also co-founded Sandstorm, an "open source platform for personal servers". Sandstorm was initially started with crowdfunding, and later raised a $1.3 million seed round lead by Quest Venture Partners.

References

External links
 Personal website and blog

American women neuroscientists
American computer programmers
American neuroscientists
1983 births
Living people
People from Mountain View, California
Scientists from California
Stanford University alumni
Northwestern University alumni
21st-century American women